Fern Gwendolyn Persons (née Ball; July 27, 1910 – July 22, 2012) was an American film and television actress and a member of the Screen Actors Guild‐American Federation of Television and Radio Artists from 1937 until her death. Her film credits included Field of Dreams and Hoosiers.

Persons served on the national board of directors of the Screen Actors Guild (SAG) from 1976–98. She also sat on SAG's Chicago Branch Council for 44 years and the AFTRA Chicago Local Board for more than thirty years. Much of her work at SAG and AFTRA focused on improving the professional acting opportunities for older actors.

Life and career
Fern Gwendolyn Ball was born in 1910 in Chicago, Illinois, and moved to Kalamazoo, Michigan as a young girl with her family. She earned a Bachelor of Arts in drama from Kalamazoo College in 1933. She later received a Bachelor of Fine Arts of acting from Carnegie Institute of Technology, now called Carnegie Mellon University in Pittsburgh, Pennsylvania. She graduated magna cum laude and Phi Beta Kappa from both colleges. She was also awarded the Otto Kahn Prize for excellence in acting at Carnegie.

Ball met her future husband, Max Persons, while both were college students. They married in 1935. Once she graduated from Carnegie, Persons worked in Detroit in radio for a short period. The family, which now included a newborn daughter, then moved to Chicago so Persons could pursue her acting career in the latter half of the 1930s.

Persons joined Screen Actors Guild (SAG) in 1937 and became the fifth member of the SAG Chicago Branch when she joined in 1953. She was elected to the Chicago Branch Council in 1962 and served for forty-four years until 2006, when she stepped down only because she could no longer drive. She also served more than thirty years on the AFTRA Chicago Local Board. Persons was elected to the SAG National Board in 1976, and served on that body until 1998. During that time, from 1977–81, she was elected SAG 5th national vice president. She served as a SAG Regional Branch Division representative on TV/Theatrical and Commercials negotiating committees throughout the 1980s and intermittently through the 1990s.

Personal life
Fern Ball married Max Persons in October 1935 and remained married for thirty-six years until his death in November 1971. On July 27, 1999, Chicago Mayor Richard Daley officially declared "Fern Persons Day" to mark her 89th birthday. The day honored her contributions to the Chicago arts and acting communities. Persons had previously resided in Evanston, Illinois. Persons moved to Colorado in 2010 to be closer to her daughter.

Death
She died in her sleep on July 22, 2012 in Littleton, Colorado at the age of 101. She was survived by her daughter, Nancy Rockafellow,  three grandsons and six great-grandchildren.

Filmography
Films
The Golden Gloves Story (1950) - Mrs. Burke
Man of Steel (1965)
On the Right Track (1981) - Flower Lady
Hudson Taylor (1981)
Class (1983) - Headmistress DeBreul
Risky Business (1983) - Lab Teacher
Grandview, U.S.A. (1984) - Teacher
Hoosiers (1986) - Opal Fleener
Field of Dreams (1989) - Annie's Mother
Prelude to a Kiss (1992) - Elderly Woman
The Secret (2001) - Great Aunt Daria
Boricua (2004) - Hilde Klingenberg (final film role)

Television
Those Endearing Young Charms; main cast (1952) - Abbe Charm
The Mickey Mouse Club; 1 episode (1956)
Adventure in Dairyland; main cast (1956) - Mrs. McCandless
Cavalcade of America; 1 episode (1957) - Mrs. Hubbard
Chicago Story; TV Movie (1982)
American Playhouse; 1 episode (1984) - Aunt Vera
Hard Knox; TV Movie (1984)
Jack and Mike; 1 episode (1987)
Sable; 1 episode (1987) - Rebecca Sable
Mario and the Mob; TV Movie (1992)
Missing Persons; 1 episode (1993) - Althea Swanson
Early Edition; 2 episodes (1997–1999) - Mrs. Flowers, Librarian / Helen
ER; 1 episode (1999) - Old Woman on El

References

External links
 
 Notice of death of Fern Persons, SAG/AFTRA website; accessed March 4, 2014.

1910 births
2012 deaths
People from Kalamazoo, Michigan
Actresses from Evanston, Illinois
Actresses from Michigan
American film actresses
American television actresses
American centenarians
Kalamazoo College alumni
Carnegie Mellon University College of Fine Arts alumni
Women centenarians